Platydoris argo, the redbrown nudibranch or redbrown leathery doris, is a species of dorid nudibranch, a sea slug, in the family Discodorididae.

Distribution
This species is known from the Mediterranean Sea and adjacent Atlantic Ocean.

References

Discodorididae
Gastropods described in 1767
Taxa named by Carl Linnaeus